Apurba Sarma (born January 1, 1943) is a National Award-winning film critic and a Sahitya Akademi winning author from Halem, Sonitpur district, Assam. He is one of the brothers of Arun Sarma who is also a Sahitya Academy Award winning author. He did his Masters in Economics at Gauhati University (1965). And later worked as a staff reporter at The Assam Tribune (1965–1967), as lecturer in economics at Nowgong Girls College (1967–1997), as principal, Nowgong Girls College (1997–2002), and as editor of Ajir Asom, an Assamese daily published by The Sentinel (Guwahati). He is presently the founder-president of Xahitya Mancha Asom, a Guwahati-based society of writers and fans of Assamese literature.

Awards and accolades
Sahitya Akademi Award for Creative Literature in Assamese (2000)
National Film Award (Swarna Kamal) for Best Book on Cinema (2002)
Assam Valley Literary Award for Creative Literature (2015)

Jury member
National Film Award - 2005
National Film Award – 2007

Author
Books
Six anthologies of short fiction in Assamese
Axomiya Chalachitrar Sa-Pohar (Light and Shade on Assamese Cinema)
The Lone Ranger in a Forsaken Frontier (on the life of the pioneer filmmaker of Indian Cinema in the North East)

Features in journals
 Filming 'Literature' (Deep Focus, Vol. VI 1996)
 An Experience of Oppression in Assamese Cinema (Deep Focus, vol. VII No 3 &4, 1997–98)

See also 
Film Critics Circle of India

References

External links 
 FCCI official site
 Assamese Books
 Youtube

Indian film critics
Living people
1943 births